The Union Pacific Corporation is a publicly traded railroad holding company. It was incorporated in Utah in 1969 and is headquartered in Omaha, Nebraska. It is the parent company of the current, Delaware-registered, form of the Union Pacific Railroad.

Union Pacific was located in New York City from the company's re-founding in 1969 until Drew Lewis became CEO in the mid-1980s. He relocated the corporate headquarters to Bethlehem, Pennsylvania. Later the headquarters was shifted to Dallas, Texas, before relocating the corporate headquarters to Omaha to join the Union Pacific Railroad headquarters. On February 27, 2023 president and CEO Lance M. Fritz stepped down after repeated pressure from share holders calling for his replacement. Fritz will stay on at his current role as the board finds his replacement. 

The Union Pacific Corporation has a portfolio of acquiring the Missouri Pacific Railroad which included the Missouri–Kansas–Texas Railroad, the Chicago and North Western Transportation Company, the Western Pacific Railroad, the Denver and Rio Grande Western Railroad, the St. Louis Southwestern Railway, the SPCSL Corporation, and the Southern Pacific Transportation Company. All railroads not including the Southern Pacific Transportation Company were merged into the previous form of the Union Pacific Railroad. As part of the UP-SP merger which included the merging of the Denver and Rio Grande Western Railroad, the St. Louis Southwestern Railway and the SPCSL Corporation into the previous form of the Union Pacific Railroad, the Union Pacific Corporation merged the previous form of the Union Pacific Railroad into the Southern Pacific Transportation Company and renamed the Southern Pacific Transportation Company to the current form of the Union Pacific Railroad.

The Union Pacific Corporation's main competitor is Burlington Northern Santa Fe, LLC, the parent company of BNSF Railway. BNSF is the nation's second largest freight rail network and primarily services the same territory as Union Pacific, west of the Mississippi River. Together, Union Pacific and BNSF have a duopoly on all long-haul freight rail service in the Western United States.

History

Origins
The first Union Pacific Railroad, pronounced "Union Pacific Rail Road" was incorporated on July 1, 1862, under an act of Congress entitled Pacific Railroad Act of 1862. The act was approved by President Abraham Lincoln, and it provided for the construction of railroads from the Missouri River to the Pacific as a war measure for the preservation of the Union. It was constructed westward from Council Bluffs, Iowa to meet the Central Pacific Railroad line, which was constructed eastward from San Francisco Bay. The combined Union Pacific-Central Pacific line became known as the First transcontinental railroad and Overland Route. The original UP was entangled in the Crédit Mobilier scandal, exposed in 1872. Later, the original UP was in financial troubles because of the financial crisis of 1873 but did not go into bankruptcy.

The original company was taken over by the new Union Pacific Railway on January 24, 1880 and the original company was merged into the Union Pacific Railway. The Union Pacific Railway declared bankruptcy during the Panic of 1893.

In 1897 a new "Union Pacific Railroad" (pronounced "Railroad") was formed and the Union Pacific Railway was merged into the new Union Pacific Railroad. This Union Pacific Railroad is the third incarnation, and the third incarnation makes up the bulk of the Union Pacific history. The third Union Pacific Railroad lasted until 1998 when it was replaced by the fourth incarnation, formerly the Southern Pacific Transportation Company, the last incarnation of the Southern Pacific railroad. The Union Pacific Corporation was established during the tenure of the third Union Pacific Railroad.

Establishment and current ownership of the current Union Pacific Railroad
The Union Pacific Corporation was established in 1969 with its incorporation in Utah and it was established to take control of the then third incarnation of the Union Pacific Railroad later referred to as Mark I and its non-railroad subsidiaries.

The Union Pacific Corporation was established the same year the current Union Pacific railroad began. The current Union Pacific Railroad is the fourth incarnation and it is referred to as Mark II; the current incarnation of the Union Pacific Railroad is formerly known as the Southern Pacific Transportation Company, the last incarnation of the Southern Pacific railroad. The Union Pacific Corporation merged the third Union Pacific Railroad into the Southern Pacific Transportation Company and then renamed the Southern Pacific Transportation Company to the current Union Pacific Railroad.

Subsidiary history
The Union Pacific Corporation is the parent company of all UP subsidiaries and operating companies besides the current Union Pacific Railroad (the largest operating company). The Union Pacific Corporation, under the current Union Pacific Railroad, owns the Alton and Southern Railway, a switching railroad.

The Union Pacific Corporation operated the Southern Pacific Rail Corporation (formerly the second Rio Grande Industries and former parent company for the current Union Pacific railroad) until 2015 when it was merged into the current primary railroad subsidiary.

Union Pacific Corporation used to have short lived subsidiaries: 
 UP Leasing Corporation
 UP Rail (or UP Rail, Inc.)
 UP Holdings (or UP Holdings, Inc.), originally known as Union Pacific Holdings (or Union Pacific Holdings, Inc.)
 UP Holding Company (or UP Holding Company, Inc. and UP Holding)
 Union Pacific Merger Company (Union Pacific Merger Co., or UP Merger and UP Mergerco)
 UP Acquisition Corporation (or UP Acquisition)
 Union Pacific Resources Group (Union Pacific Resources Group, Inc. or simply Resources and Union Pacific Resources)  
 Overnite Transportation Company (or "Overnite Transportation"), includes Overnite subsidiary Motor Cargo.

The Union Pacific Corporation operated the Overnite Transportation Company, a trucking company, until it was sold to United Parcel Service (UPS) and renamed UPS Freight.

Merger history and subsidiary involvement during the merger history
The Union Pacific merger history began with the Union Pacific Corporation acquiring the Missouri Pacific Railroad (which included the Missouri–Kansas–Texas Railroad, and the Western Pacific Railroad. The Union Pacific Corporation merged the Western Pacific Railroad into the third Union Pacific Railroad and then merged the Missouri–Kansas–Texas Railroad into the Missouri Pacific Railroad and transferred direct ownership of the Missouri Pacific Railroad to the third Union Pacific Railroad. The Missouri Pacific Railroad continued operations until January 1, 1997 when it was merged into the third Union Pacific Railroad by the Union Pacific Corporation.

The subsidiaries UP Leasing Corporation, UP Rail and UP Holdings were part of the Union Pacific take over of the Chicago and North Western Transportation Company which was renamed to its original name Chicago and North Western Railway, and its holding company, the Chicago and North Western Holdings Corporation which was renamed to the second Chicago and North Western Transportation Company.

In April 1995, the former Chicago and North Western Holdings Corporation (the second Chicago and North Western Transportation Company), along with the Chicago and North Western Railway (formerly the first Chicago and North Western Transportation Company), was acquired by the Union Pacific Corporation.

UP Holdings was merged into UP Rail. The Union Pacific Corporation merged UP Rail into the third Union Pacific Railroad. Finally, the Union Pacific Corporation merged the second Chicago and North Western Transportation Company (formerly Chicago and North Western Holdings Corporation) and the Chicago and North Western Railway (formerly the first Chicago and North Western Transportation Company) into the third Union Pacific Railroad, the Chicago and North Western system is now part of the Union Pacific Railroad system. A joint UP-CNW subsidiary, Western Railroad Properties (or "Western Railroad Properties, Inc."), was also merged into the Union Pacific system.

The subsidiaries UP Holding Company, Union Pacific Merger Company and UP Acquisition Corporation were part of the Union Pacific take over of the Southern Pacific Rail Corporation (formerly the second Rio Grande Industries) and the Southern Pacific Transportation Company, the current Union Pacific Railroad.

The Union Pacific Corporation purchased the Southern Pacific Rail Corporation which included the Southern Pacific Transportation Company, the Denver and Rio Grande Western Railroad, the St. Louis Southwestern Railway and the SPCSL Corporation. The Union Pacific Corporation originally purchased a portion of the Southern Pacific Rail Corporation under the UP Acquisition Corporation subsidiary; the UP Acquisition Corporation subsidiary originally acquired 25 percent of SP's outstanding common shares for $25 per share cash. In June 1996, the UP Acquisition Corporation was merged into the Union Pacific Corporation, the 25 percent of SP's outstanding common shares is now controlled by the Union Pacific Corporation, leaving only 75 percent of SP common shares not owned by the Union Pacific Corporation that was originally going to the UP Acquisition Corporation subsidiary. In September 1996, the Union Pacific Corporation acquired the remaining 75 percent of SP common shares not previously owned by the Union Pacific Corporation. On September 10, 1996, the Union Pacific Merger Company was merged into the Union Pacific Corporation.

The Union Pacific Corporation merged the Denver and Rio Grande Western Railroad, the St. Louis Southwestern Railway and the SPCSL Corporation into the third Union Pacific Railroad.

The Union Pacific Corporation merged the third Union Pacific Railroad into the Southern Pacific Transportation Company in 1998; the Southern Pacific Transportation Company becomes the surviving railroad and at the same time the Union Pacific Corporation renamed the Southern Pacific Transportation Company to fourth incarnation of the Union Pacific Railroad. The former Southern Pacific Transportation Company is now operating as the current incarnation of the Union Pacific Railroad. The Southern Pacific Rail Corporation remained a subsidiary of the Union Pacific Corporation until 2015 when it was merged into the former Southern Pacific Transportation Company, the current Union Pacific Railroad.

According to the Utah corporation database, it has been suggested that the Southern Pacific Rail Corporation was merged into UP Holding Company and UP Holding Company was renamed Southern Pacific Rail Corporation, becoming a second incarnation of the Southern Pacific Rail Corporation. It has also been suggested that UP Holding Company was originally known as "CNW Holdings" (or "CNW Holdings, Inc."). CNW Holdings could be mistaken for the Chicago and North Western Holdings Corporation, the former parent company of the Chicago and North Western.

Finances 
For the fiscal year 2017, Union Pacific reported earnings of US$3.388 billion, with an annual revenue of US$24.46 billion, an increase of 6.5% over the previous fiscal cycle. Union Pacific's shares traded at over $31 per share, and its market capitalization was valued at US$105.2 billion in October 2018.

Carbon footprint
Union Pacific Corporation reported Total CO2e emissions (Direct + Indirect) for the twelve months ending 31 December 2020 at 9,157 Kt (-1,258 /-12.1% y-o-y) and aims to achieve net zero by 2050.

See also
Union Pacific Railroad
Southern Pacific Transportation Company
Rio Grande Industries
Economy of Omaha, Nebraska

References

External links

Official Union Pacific company website

 System map
 Photographs of the Construction of the Union Pacific Railroad, 1868–69 at the Beinecke Rare Book and Manuscript Library at Yale University

Railway companies established in 1969
American companies established in 1969
1969 establishments in New York City
United States railroad holding companies
Union Pacific Railroad
Companies listed on the New York Stock Exchange
Companies that filed for Chapter 11 bankruptcy in 1983
Economy of the Western United States
Companies in the Dow Jones Transportation Average
Companies based in Omaha, Nebraska